The 2018 Prudential RideLondon–Surrey Classic was a road cycling one-day race that took place on 29 July in London, England. It was the seventh edition of the London–Surrey Classic and was the twenty-sixth event of the 2018 UCI World Tour.

Result

References

Further reading

External links

2018 UCI World Tour
2018 in British sport
July 2018 sports events in the United Kingdom
2018